Raaj Kamal Films International is an Indian film production and distribution company founded and headed by Kamal Haasan.  Raja Paarvai (1981) was the first film to be produced by them under the banner "Haasan Brothers" before renaming it to Raaj Kamal Films International.

Filmography

Films produced

Films distributed 

In addition to the films produced by Raaj Kamal films since 1981, the following films from other banners were distributed by the company:

Cancelled projects 

 Ladies Only (1997)
 Marudhanayagam (1999)
 Sabaash Naidu (2019)

Awards

References

External links 
 
 

Film distributors of India
Film production companies based in Chennai
Kamal Haasan
1981 establishments in Tamil Nadu
Indian companies established in 1981
Mass media companies established in 1981